Arracacia macvaughii is a plant species native to the Mexican State of Querétaro. It is known only from the type locale, in a fir (Abies religiosa) forest at an elevation of approximately 3100 m (10,300 feet).

Arracacia macvaughii has a large taproot producing a stem up to 30 cm (12 inches) tall. Leaves are up to 5 cm (2 inches) long, pinnatifid with obovate leaflets. Fruits are white. Fruits are about 3 mm long, tapering at the tip.

References

Apioideae
Flora of Querétaro
Endemic flora of Mexico
Taxa named by Lincoln Constance
Taxa named by Mildred Esther Mathias